Patrick Bailey may refer to:

Pat Bailey (born 1956), American baseball coach
Patrick Bailey (American football) (born 1985), American footballer
Patrick Bailey (baseball) (born 1999), American baseball player